104 Squadron is a reserve squadron of the South African Air Force.  This squadron is used mostly in the VIP/IP transport role as well as reconnaissance flights in the Gauteng area.  The squadron is based at AFB Waterkloof.  These reserve squadrons are used to fill a pilot and aircraft gap within the SAAF by making use of civilian pilots and their privately owned aircraft.  Most flying takes place over weekends and because pilots have a good knowledge of the local terrain in the area where they live and commonly fly, the squadron is also often used in a crime prevention role.

References

Squadrons of the South African Air Force
Military units and formations in Pretoria
Territorial Reserve Squadrons of the South African Air Force